We Mangje Lhalo was a general of Tibetan Empire.

He invaded Tang China together with Dro Trisu Ramsha in 814. He was appointed as the Lönchen and later succeeded by another general Dro Trisumje Taknang.

References
Old Tibetan Chronicle, P.T. 1287

9th-century Tibetan people
People of the Tibetan Empire